Chal Mera Putt 2 is a 2020 Indian Punjabi-language comedy drama film directed by Janjot Singh. It is a direct sequel to 2019 film Chal Mera Putt. The film is produced by Karaj Gill under Rhythm Boyz Entertainment and by Ashu Munish Sahni under Omjee Star Studios. It stars Amrinder Gill, Simi Chahal, and Garry Sandhu in lead roles. The film revolves around Punjabis trying hard to make a living in a foreign land. The film also stars Iftikhar Thakur, Rup Khatkar, Nasir Chinyoti, Akram Udas, Zafri Khan, Gurshabad, Hardeep Gill, Nirmal Rishi, and Ruby Anam in supporting roles.

Development of the film began following the success of the prequel, and was announced by Thakur in November 2019. The principal photography of the film began on 12 November 2019 in Birmingham, and ended on 27 December 2019. The film was shot in United Kingdom and India. The film was released worldwide on 13 March 2020. The film was affected in several territories due to outbreak of coronavirus pandemic. The film was re-released worldwide on 27 August 2021.

Cast 

 Amrinder Gill as Jaswinder Singh 'Jinder'
 Simi Chahal as Swaran Kaur 'Savy'
 Garry Sandhu as Deepa
 Iftikhar Thakur as Chaudhary Shamsher
 Nasir Chinyoti as Tabrez
 Akram Udas as Boota
 Hardeep Gill as Bikkar Chacha
 Gurshabad as Balwinder Singh 'Billa'
 Rup Khatkar as Bal
 Zafri Khan as Advocate Bilal Randhawa
Nirmal Rishi as Deepa's aunt
 Agha Majid as Tabrez's father
 Rubi Anam as Saira
 Seema Kaushal as Bikkar's wife
 Sanju Solanki as Billa's father
 Navdeep Brar as Veer
 Raj Dhaliwal as Boota's wife
 Amanat Chan as Mithoo

Production 

After the success of Chal Mera Putt, makers decided to make two sequels of the film. Iftikhar Thakur in an interview disclosed that Zafri Khan and Rubi Anam are also part of cast, and will play pivotal roles in the film. Garry Sandhu was confirmed as a lead actor alongside Amrinder Gill and Simi Chahal following the release of the title poster. Cast and crew of the prequel reprised their roles whereas Sandhu, Khan, Anam and Nirmal Rishi were added to the cast. Sandhu marks his comeback in Punjabi cinema after 6 years with his last film Romeo Ranjha (2014).

Principal photography of the film began on 12 November 2019 in Birmingham and was wrapped on 22 December 2019. The film was shot in United Kingdom and India. First schedule of the filming was completed in London. United Kingdom schedule was wrapped on 27 December 2019. Additional filming took place in January 2020. The film's final dubbing took place in February 2020. The film was edited by Rohit Dhiman and its final cut ran for a total of 124 minutes and 47 seconds. The film is produced by Rhythm Boyz Entertainment in collaboration with Gillz Network, Omjee Star Studios, and Phantasy Films Ltd Productions. Distribution rights were acquired by Omjee Group in India while Rhythm Boyz itself in overseas.

Soundtrack 

The film's soundtrack is composed by Dr Zeus, which includes vocals by Amrinder Gill, Gurshabad, Nimrat Khaira, and Shipra Goyal. Background score is composed by Gurcharan Singh. Lyrics were penned by Satta Vairowalia, Harmanjeet, and Bir Singh. The song "Boota Gaalan Kad Da Ae" was ranked in New Zealand YouTube music weekly chart. The song "Majhe Wal Da" and its music video was praised by critics. The song also featured in Australia and New Zealand YouTube charts.

Track List

Release and marketing 

The film was released worldwide on 13 March 2020. The film became the biggest Punjabi release ever in United Kingdom and Australia with the screen count over 60 screens. Cast of the film promoted the film in different countries by dividing pairs. Similarly, as the prequel the film is facing difficulties in Pakistan release due to the cultural ban between India and Pakistan in the aftermath of the 2019 Pulwama attack. Discussions were held by the local distributors with government officials and censor board in Pakistan for release of the film. Entertainment Pakistan stated that the film may release in Pakistan following the talks by distributors with government circles. However, the film was not released in Pakistan on scheduled date. On 14 March 2020, cinema halls were ordered to close by Punjab government due to outbreak of coronavirus. Due to shutdown makers have decided to re-release the film worldwide, following the cinema hall opening again.

On 3 February 2020, the film's title poster was released along its release date as 13 March 2020. On 20 February 2020, the first song "Boota Gaalan Kad Da Ae" from the film's soundtrack, sung by Amrinder Gill and Gurshabad was released. The official trailer of the film was released on 23 February 2020. The trailer crossed the million views within eight hours, and 2.7 million views on YouTube within twenty-four hours of its release. On 1 March 2020, the second song "Majboori" from the film, sung by Gurshabad was released. On 11 March 2020, the promotional duet track "Majhe Wal Da", sung by Gill and Nimrat Khaira is releasing. Also, the song "Baddlan De Kaalje" was released in the prequel, which was sung by the same duo. On 12 March 2020, the title track of the film sung by Gill and Gurshabad was released.

The film was released on 13 March 2020 but was pulled out of theaters because of COVID-19 pandemic lockdown in India. In May, it was announced that the film will be re-released once the lockdown will be over. The film was re-released in Dubai on 27 May 2020. When Karaj Gill was asked about releasing the film digitally, he denied and said, "The kind of money OTT platforms offer to regional cinema is not enough to recover the costs. Low-budget films might be able to break even through this, but not us."

The Movie was re-released by many theatres in September 2021.

Reception

Box office 
In India, the film opened at better occupancy than the Bollywood release Angrezi Medium, which was released on same day. The film collected  80-90 lakhs nett on its first day in India.  In India, the film opened with ₹1.24 crore on its opening day, followed by ₹1.52 crore on its second day. However, it collected just ₹16 lakhs on its third day following the cinemas shutdown across Punjab and other states, making the weekend total of ₹2.92 crore. Box Office India estimated its opening weekend as ₹5.38 crore if no shutdown has taken place across the country.

It opened at No. 6 in Australia with grossing A$99,964 and No. 4 in New Zealand with gross of NZ$36,932 on its opening day. In its opening weekend, the film grossed A$391,757 in Australia from 62 screens with a per-screen average of over A$6,300, and finished fifth in the weekend chart. In New Zealand, it finished fourth, grossing NZ$123,300 in its opening weekend. In United States and Canada, the film grossed US$367,000 from 78 theatres, with highest per-screen average of $4,700 in its opening weekend. The weekend was also noteworthy for being the lowest combined-grossing since October 1998, with all films totaling just $55.3 million. According to Bollywood Hungama, the film grossed US$82,935 in United States, US$305,329 in Canada, £87,842 in United Kingdom, and €4,831 in Germany in its opening weekend. The film grossed A$538,073 and NZ$161,574 in its opening week in Australia and New Zealand respectively. As of May 2020, the film has grossed US$76,384 at United Arab Emirates.

The film re-released on 27 August 2021,  and collected ₹1.01 crore and 1.15 crore on opening days respectively in India. In United States and Canada, the film grossed $163,000 on its first day with the highest per screen average of $7,462.

As of 12 September 2021 the film has grossed ₹17.19 crores in India and ₹30.41 crores at overseas market. The film has grossed worldwide ₹47.60 crores.

Critical reception 
Chal Mera Putt 2 opened to the positive response from audience and critics. Gautam Batra of Koimoi gave three and a half star out of five. The site's consensus reads, "Chal Mera Putt 2 is a film not to be missed. It’s a thorough family entertainer which will make you laugh, cry and will create a special place in your heart". Gurlove Singh of BookMyShow said, "Chal Mera Putt 2 is a perfect follow up to the 2019 blockbuster Chal Mera Putt. It’s heartwarming to see Indian and Pakistani actors share screen space. The quality of cinema that they bring out from their acts is worth applauding. The film has a number of comic sequences that bring the house down".

Sequel 
A sequel Chal Mera Putt 3 was released on 1 October 2021.

References

External links 

 

Indian sequel films
Punjabi-language Indian films
2020s Punjabi-language films
Films shot in England
Indian comedy-drama films
India–Pakistan relations in popular culture
2020 comedy-drama films
Films directed by Janjot Singh